Darkthrone is a Norwegian extreme metal band from Kolbotn, Akershus. Formed in 1986 as a death metal band named Black Death, in 1991 Darkthrone embraced a black metal style influenced by Bathory and Celtic Frost and became one of the leading bands in the Norwegian black metal scene. 

Their first three black metal albums—A Blaze in the Northern Sky (1992), Under a Funeral Moon (1993) and Transilvanian Hunger (1994)—are sometimes dubbed the "Unholy Trinity". They are considered the peak of the band's career and to be among the most influential albums in black metal.

Darkthrone has been a duo of Fenriz and Nocturno Culto since guitarist Zephyrous left the band in 1993. They have sought to remain outside the music mainstream. From 2006, their music strayed from the traditional black metal style and incorporated more elements of traditional heavy metal, punk, and speed metal, while more recent albums have also included doom metal.

History

Death metal years: 1986–1991
The band that would become Darkthrone formed in late 1986 in Kolbotn, a small town south of Oslo. They were a death metal band by the name of Black Death whose members were Gylve Nagell, Ivar Enger and Anders Risberget. Their main inspirations were Autopsy, Venom, Hellhammer, Celtic Frost, Slayer and Nocturnus. In late 1987, the band changed their name to Darkthrone and were joined by Dag Nilsen. Ted Skjellum joined in spring of 1988. During 1988 and 1989, the band independently released four demo tapes: Land of Frost, A New Dimension, Thulcandra, and Cromlech.

They were subsequently signed to the independent record label Peaceville Records with a four-album contract. In 1990, they recorded their first studio album, Soulside Journey. Because of a small recording budget, the band could not afford the kind of studio they wanted but, thanks to the members of Nihilist and Entombed, they were able to record their album at Sunlight Studios. Although mainly death metal in style, there were some elements of black metal present in terms of artwork and songwriting.

Immediately following the release of this album, the band continued writing and recording new material, recording on tape until a full album was ready. These tracks were entirely instrumental but they demonstrated the band's gradual shift towards black metal. In 1996, the finished album Goatlord was released, with vocals added by Fenriz.

Black metal years

Early black metal years: 1991–1994

During 1991 under the influence of Euronymous of Mayhem, Darkthrone adopted the aesthetic style that would come to represent the black metal scene, wearing corpse paint and working under pseudonyms. Gylve Nagell became "Fenriz", Ted Skjellum became "Nocturno Culto" and Ivar Enger became "Zephyrous". In August 1991, they recorded their second album, which was released at the beginning of 1992 and titled A Blaze in the Northern Sky. The album contained Darkthrone's first black metal recordings, and Peaceville Records was originally skeptical about releasing it due to Darkthrone's extreme diversion from their original death metal style. After the album was recorded, bassist Dag Nilsen left the band, as he didn't want to play black metal, and is merely credited as "session bass" with no picture on the album.

The band's third album, Under a Funeral Moon, was recorded in the summer of 1992 and released in early 1993. It marked Darkthrone's total conversion to the black metal style, and is considered a landmark for the development of the genre as a whole. This album also marked the last album on which guitarist Zephyrous would perform.

It was followed by their fourth album, Transilvanian Hunger, which was released in February 1994. This was Darkthrone's first album to have just two members, Nocturno Culto and Fenriz. Fenriz is credited with all instrumentation and songwriting, while Nocturno Culto only contributed vocals. The band would remain a duo from this point onwards. Transilvanian Hunger was characterized by a very "raw" or "low fidelity" recording style and  monotone riffing with little melody. The album's release caused some controversy: half of its lyrics were written by the Norwegian black metal musician Varg Vikernes, and its booklet contained the phrase "Norsk Arisk Black Metal", which translates into English as "Norwegian Aryan Black Metal".

With Moonfog Records: 1995–2004
Darkthrone moved to another independent record label, Moonfog Productions, for subsequent releases. The label was run by Satyr of Satyricon.

Their fifth album, Panzerfaust, was released in 1995. Its production is similar to that of Transilvanian Hunger, and Fenriz is similarly credited with all instrumentation and songwriting, while Nocturno Culto only contributed vocals. Lyrics for the track "Quintessence" were written by Varg Vikernes. Their sixth album, Total Death, was released during 1996 and is notable for featuring lyrics written by four other black metal musicians, and none at all written by the group's main lyricist Fenriz.

During the years 1993–1995, drummer Fenriz was involved with numerous side projects. This included his solo dark ambient project Neptune Towers, his solo folk black metal project Isengard, recording an album with Satyr as the trio Storm, and playing bass on Dødheimsgard's debut album. Also he began playing drums for Valhall again, after having been one of the founding members in 1988 but leaving in 1990 to concentrate on Darkthrone.

In 1999, Darkthrone released the album Ravishing Grimness, and in 2001 their following album, Plaguewielder. While Transilvanian Hunger and Panzerfaust had songs written solely by Fenriz, these two albums had songs almost entirely written by Nocturno Culto and were both recorded in Ronny Le Tekrøe's studio at Toten, Norway. This explains the somewhat "clearer" sound on those records.

In the last years of the 1990s, two Darkthrone tribute albums were released: Darkthrone Holy Darkthrone in 1998 and The Next Thousand Years Are Ours in 1999. The band also released Preparing for War, a compilation of songs from 1988–1994. In 2002, the intro of their song "Kathaarian Life Code" appeared in the last scene of the film Demonlover.

In 2003, the band released the album Hate Them. Although this record and their next contain electronic introductions, they remain true to Darkthrone's early black metal style. Sardonic Wrath was released in 2004. It was the band's last album with Moonfog Productions and their last to be recorded solely in the black metal style. This album was nominated for Norway's Alarm Awards; however, the album's entry was withdrawn at the band's request. Their next releases would feature strong crust punk traits.

Punk metal years: 2005–2010
In 2005, Darkthrone confirmed that they had returned to Peaceville Records, after leaving the record label in 1994. They had also started up their own record label, Tyrant Syndicate Productions, to release their future albums. To celebrate their return, Peaceville re-issued the Preparing for War compilation with a bonus CD of demos and a DVD of live performances. Darkthrone's first four albums were also re-released with video interviews about each of them.

In January 2006, the group released the EP Too Old, Too Cold, which contains the track "High on Cold War", performed by  Enslaved's vocalist Grutle Kjellson. The EP also included a cover of the song "Love in a Void" by Siouxsie and the Banshees. For the first time in their career, the band shot a music video for the EP's title track.  Too Old, Too Cold  also became Darkthrone's first record to hit the charts and reached the top 15 of the best-selling singles in Norway and Denmark. Darkthrone released their eleventh album, The Cult Is Alive, the same year. The album represented a shift in the band's style as the music incorporated crust punk traits. While Darkthrone's black metal roots were still evident, their shift from the genre's typical sound was more noticeable. The Cult Is Alive was the first Darkthrone album to appear on the album chart in Norway, debuting at number 22.

In July 2007, the band released the EP NWOBHM (an acronym for 'New wave of black heavy metal', a take-off on the original 'New wave of British heavy metal') as a preview for their next album. In September that year, Darkthrone released the album F.O.A.D. (an acronym for Fuck Off and Die). The phrase was used by many thrash metal and punk bands during the 1980s. While the music partially continued the punk-oriented style that was introduced on The Cult Is Alive, this time the band focused more on traditional heavy metal.

Also during 2007, Nocturno Culto completed and released The Misanthrope, a film about black metal and life in Norway. It includes some of his own solo recordings. In October 2008, Dark Thrones and Black Flags was released, using much the same style as the previous album. In 2010, the band released the album Circle the Wagons, which featured much less significant crust punk traits in exchange for strong speed metal and traditional heavy metal characteristics.

Since 2010
In late 2010, Peaceville acquired the rights to the band's Moonfog albums and re-issued Panzerfaust as a two-disc set and on vinyl. The re-issue of Total Death was set for 14 March 2011. In July 2012, Darkthrone announced a new album, titled The Underground Resistance; it was released on 25 February 2013. That album saw the band completely shift away from black metal and blackened crust and is musically a throwback to classic heavy metal and speed metal. The band released their 16th studio album, titled Arctic Thunder, on 14 October 2016, it represented another drastic musical shift for the band, with the album featuring a rawer, more blackened sound, reminiscent of their 90's output but with the classic metal leanings of the previous record.

On 22 October 2016, the band revealed via Facebook that they would be issuing a compilation album entitled The Wind of 666 Black Hearts. The album, released 25 November 2016, is composed of rehearsals recorded in 1991 and 1992 for songs which later appeared on A Blaze in the Northern Sky and Under a Funeral Moon. 

Darkthrone announced in March 2019 that they would be releasing their seventeenth studio album, Old Star, which was released on 31 May of the same year. It featured much stronger doom metal characteristics than previous albums, with their Candlemass influences more apparent. The band announced that they had completed the recording of a new album in January 2021. In April 2021, a box set was unveiled containing early and rare material entitled Shadows of Iconoclasm. The band's eighteenth studio album Eternal Hails...... was released on 25 June 2021, through Peaceville Records on physical media and digital platforms. Musically, the album is a continuation of the band's incorporation of traditional doom metal, strongly influenced by Candlemass from the previous record, with heavy inspiration from other bands like Trouble and Black Sabbath. The band's nineteenth album, Astral Fortress, was released on the 28th of October 2022.

Band members
Current
Fenriz (Gylve Fenris Nagell) – drums, guitars, bass, keyboards, vocals, lyrics (1986–present)
Nocturno Culto (Ted Skjellum) – vocals, guitars, bass, producer, lyrics (1988–present)
Former
Dag Nilsen – bass (1988–1991)
Zephyrous (Ivar Enger) – guitar (1987–1993)
Anders Risberget – guitar (1986–1988)
Timeline

Associations 
 Aura Noir – Fenriz has recorded vocals with the band, and two Aura Noir members have done the same for Darkthrone.
 Burzum – the albums Transilvanian Hunger and Panzerfaust feature lyrics by Varg Vikernes.
 Dødheimsgard – Fenriz (bass and vocals), 1994–1995.
 Fenriz' Red Planet – solo doom metal project of Fenriz, 1993.
 Isengard – solo folk black metal project of Fenriz, 1989–1995.
 Mayhem – Fenriz wrote some lyrics for the band, one of which were used as the title for the Dawn of the Black Hearts live album. It featured a photograph of Pelle "Dead" Ohlin's corpse after his suicide. The lyrics sheet can also be seen in the liner notes of the Life Eternal EP.
 Neptune Towers – solo dark ambient project of Fenriz, 1993–1995.
 Sarke – Nocturno Culto (vocals).
 Satyricon – Nocturno Culto has recorded and performed with the band. He plays rhythm guitar on Nemesis Divina under the name "Kveldulv".
 Storm – Fenriz, 1995. 
 Valhall – Fenriz (drums), 1987–1989, 1993–present.
 Taake – Nocturno Culto performed guest vocals on "Fra vadested til vaandesmed" from Noregs vaapen.
 Gift of Gods – solo project of Nocturno Culto.

Discography

Studio albums

Demos
1988 – Land of Frost
1988 – A New Dimension - rehearsal demo
1989 – Thulcandra
1989 – Cromlech - live demo

EPs and singles
2005 – Under Beskyttelse av Mørke (Under Cover of Darkness) – outtakes from the Under a Funeral Moon rehearsal sessions; released only in Japan.
2006 – Too Old, Too Cold – outtakes from The Cult Is Alive recording sessions.
2006 – Forebyggende Krig – single.
2007 – NWOBHM – outtakes from the F.O.A.D. recording sessions.
2013 – Leave No Cross Unturned (Edit) – single
2017 – Burial Bliss / Visual Aggression – single
2019 – The Hardship of the Scots – single
2021 – Hate Cloak – single

Compilations and tribute albums
1998 – Darkthrone Holy Darkthrone – tribute album featuring eight Norwegian bands
1999 – The Next Thousand Years Are Ours – tribute album featuring fourteen bands and a multimedia disc
2000 – Preparing for War – compilation of songs from 1988–1994; re-released in 2005 with a bonus CD of demos and a DVD
2008 – Frostland Tapes – compilation containing the band's early demos (Land of Frost, A New Dimension, Thulcandra, Cromlech), the original instrumental version of Goatlord, and a recording of a concert in Denmark
2011 – Sempiternal Past – The Darkthrone Demos – re-mastered versions of Darkthrone's demos (including bonus tracks)
2013 – Introducing Darkthrone – eighteen song album containing Darkthrone songs from past albums and singles
2013 – Peaceville Presents... Darkthrone
2014 – Black Death and Beyond - compilation released as a vinyl box set and book
2016 – The Wind of 666 Black Hearts - compilation of demos from 1991 and 1992
2021 – Shadows of Iconoclasm - compilation boxset of early material

References

External links
 [ Darkthrone] on AllMusic
 Darkthrone biography on Peaceville Records
 Darkthrone on Discogs

Norwegian death metal musical groups
Norwegian black metal musical groups
Norwegian heavy metal musical groups
Norwegian punk rock groups
Musical groups established in 1986
Musical groups established in 1988
1986 establishments in Norway
Norwegian musical duos
Musical groups from Akershus
Crust and d-beat groups
Heavy metal duos
Extreme metal musical groups
Speed metal musical groups
Peaceville Records artists
Musicians from Kolbotn